Scalptia nassa is a species of sea snail, a marine gastropod mollusk in the family Cancellariidae, the nutmeg snails.

Description
The size of an adult shell varies between 12 mm and 22 mm.

Distribution
This species is distributed in the Indian Ocean along East Africa and in the Pacific Ocean along the Philippines.

References

 MacNae, W. & M. Kalk (eds) (1958). A natural history of Inhaca Island, Mozambique. Witwatersrand Univ. Press, Johannesburg. I-iv, 163 pp.
 Petit, R.E. & Harasewych, M.G. (2005) Catalogue of the superfamily Cancellarioidea Forbes and Hanley, 1851 (Gastropoda: Prosobranchia)- 2nd edition. Zootaxa, 1102, 3–161. NIZT 682
 Hemmen J. (2007). Recent Cancellariidae. Wiesbaden, 428pp
 Verhecken A. (2008) Cancellariidae (Neogastropoda: Cancellarioidea) from the Philippines: Description of new species, and a range extension. Visaya 2(3): 7–17. [Published August 2008] page(s): 8

External links
 

Cancellariidae
Gastropods described in 1791